Coachcraft Ltd. of North Hollywood California built several modified cars that are generally regarded as the first examples of "custom cars", as contrasted to the coachbuilt cars with custom bodies which were purchased new in the 1930s. Strother MacMinn called the "Yankee Doodle Roadster" by Coachcraft the “first American custom sports car." Many pictures of this car can be seen by looking at the web pages in these references:

References 

Rear-wheel-drive vehicles
1940s cars
1930s cars
Car manufacturers of the United States
Defunct motor vehicle manufacturers of the United States
Motor vehicle manufacturers based in California